The Helmut-Schön-Sportpark is an American Football stadium for the Wiesbaden Phantoms American football team in Wiesbaden, Germany. It was built in 1907.  Capacity of the venue is 11,498 people.  It was used as a venue for the 2003 IFAF World Cup. Before 2009, it was called Stadion an der Berliner Straße.

Further the association football team SV Wiesbaden 1899 also play at this stadium.

American football venues in Germany
Buildings and structures in Wiesbaden
Sport in Wiesbaden
Sports venues in Hesse
1907 establishments in Germany
Sports venues completed in 1907
Football venues in Germany